Lee Young-moo (Hangul: 이영무, born July 26, 1953) is a retired South Korean football player.

Style of play
Lee didn't have a great talent or physique, but he was the most active South Korean footballer of all time. He was designated as an attacking midfielder in the starting line up, but his actual role was difficult to sort due to his tremendous work rate. He moved wide scope and took part in both the attack and the defense. According to the introduction of the Korea Football Association, he left behind an unofficial record that he moved about 20 kilometers in a match, though it needs more convincing evidence.

Personal life
Lee is a committed Christian. He always did prayer ceremonies when he scored goals. His religious belief also helped his stamina and diligence.

Career statistics

International 
 

Results list South Korea's goal tally first.

Honours

Player 
POSCO FC
Korean National Championship runner-up: 1977

ROK Army
Korean Semi-professional League (Spring): 1980
Korean National Championship: 1979
Korean President's Cup runner-up: 1980

South Korea U20
AFC Youth Championship runner-up: 1972

South Korea
Asian Games: 1978
AFC Asian Cup runner-up: 1980

Individual
Korean FA Best XI: 1975, 1976, 1977, 1978, 1979, 1980
AFC Asian Cup Team of the Tournament: 1980
Korean FA Player of the Year: 1980

Manager 
E-Land Puma
Korean Semi-professional League (Spring): 1995, 1996
Korean National Championship: 1994, 1995
Korean Semi-professional Championship: 1995
Korean President's Cup: 1994

Hallelujah FC (1999)
Korean President's Cup runner-up: 2002

Individual
Korean National Championship Best Manager: 1994

References

External links
 
 Lee Young-moo – National Team Stats at KFA 
 나의 선수시절 - 이영무, ‘원조’ 2개의 심장을 가진 사나이

1953 births
Living people
Association football midfielders
South Korean footballers
South Korea international footballers
South Korean football managers
1980 AFC Asian Cup players
pohang Steelers players
Hallelujah FC players
Goyang Zaicro FC managers
Asian Games gold medalists for South Korea
Medalists at the 1978 Asian Games
Asian Games medalists in football
Footballers at the 1978 Asian Games
People from Goyang
Kyung Hee University alumni